Leontius II of Jerusalem was the Greek Orthodox patriarch of Jerusalem from 1170 to 1190. Little is known about his activities while he was patriarch.

Leontius was born in Tiberioupolis, on the Balkan frontier of the Byzantine Empire. He was tonsured a monk in Constantinople, where he lived until he traveled through Patmos, Cyprus, to Crete. He became the hegumen of the Monastery of Saint John the Theologian in Patmos.

He was elected patriarch in 1170, succeeding Nikephoros II. Patriarch Leontius reposed in 1190.

Sources
 Leontius II, Greek-Orthodox patriarch of Jerusalem from 1170 to 1190 v ia Archive.org

12th-century Greek Orthodox Patriarchs of Jerusalem
12th-century Byzantine monks